Andrée Rose Godard (19 May 1903 – 3 October 1989), known by her stage-name as Andrée Lafayette, also known by her self-invented title as Countess Andrée de la Bigne, was a French stage and film actress, and granddaughter of the infamous demi-mondaine (prostitute) Émilie Louise Delabigne who was known by her self-invented title as Countess Valtesse de La Bigne.

Biography
Lafayette was born in 1903 to Julia Pâquerette Fossey and Paul Jules Auguste Godard. She had two siblings, Paul and Margot. Describing Lafayette as "one of the most beautiful girls in France," author Richard Walton Tully brought her to the United States to star in the film Trilby (1923). 

On April 17, 1923, Lafayette married actor Arthur Max Constant.

Selected filmography
 Trilby (1923)
 Why Get Married? (1924)
 Queen of the Boulevards (1927)
 The Eighteen Year Old (1927)
 The Great Unknown (1927)
 The Hangman (1928)
 Casanova's Legacy (1928)
 The Three Musketeers (1932)
 Fanatisme (1934)
 The Porter from Maxim's (1953)

References

Bibliography
 Goble, Alan. The Complete Index to Literary Sources in Film. Walter de Gruyter, 1999.

External links

Broadway Photographs (Univ. of South Carolina)

1903 births
1989 deaths
French film actresses
French silent film actresses
20th-century French actresses
French stage actresses
People from Yvelines